The following is a complete list of works composed by Italian avant-garde composer Luigi Nono. All works are sorted chronologically:

 Due liriche greche, for mixed chorus and instrumental ensemble (1948)
 Variazioni canoniche sulla serie dell’op. 41 di Arnold Schoenberg (1950)
 Polifonica – Monodia – Ritmica, for ensemble (1951)
 Julius Fučík, for two narrators and orchestra (1951)
 Epitaffio per Federico García Lorca No. 1, "España en el corazón", for soprano, baritone, chorus and ensemble (1951)
 Composizione per orchestra No. 1, for orchestra (1951)
 Epitaffio per Federico García Lorca No. 2, "Y su sangre ya viene cantando", for flute and small orchestra (1952)
 Due espressioni, for orchestra (1953)
 Epitaffio per Federico García Lorca No. 3, "Memento – Romance de la Guardia Civil Española", for narrator, chorus and orchestra (1953)
 Liebeslied, for mixed chorus and ensemble (1954)
 Was ihr wollt (1954)
 Der rote Mantel (1954)
 La victoire de Guernica, for mixed chorus and orchestra (1954)
 Canti per 13 (1955)
 Incontri, for 24 musicians (1955)
 Der rote Mantel Suite No. 1 (1955)
 Der rote Mantel Suite No. 2 (1955)
 Il canto sospeso, for soprano, alto, tenor, mixed chorus and orchestra (1956)
 Varianti, for solo violin, string instruments and woodwind (1957)
 La terra e la compagna, for soprano, tenor, chorus and ensemble (1957)
 Cori di Didone (1958)
 Piccola gala notturna veneziana in onore dei 60 anni di Heinrich Strobel, for piano, celesta, vibraphone, bells and strings (1958)
 Composizione per orchestra No. 2: Diario polacco ’58, for orchestra and percussion ensemble (1959)
 Omaggio a Emilio Vedova, for tape (1960)
 "Ha venido". Canciones para Silvia, for orchestra and chorus of six sopranos (1960)
 Sarà dolce tacere, for eight soloists (1960)
 Intolleranza 1960, azione scenica (1961)
 Canti di vita e d’amore: Sul ponte di Hiroshima, for soprano, tenor and orchestra (1962)
 Canciones a Guiomar, for solo soprano and ensemble (1963)
 La fabbrica illuminata, for female voice and tape (1964)
 Da un diario italiano, for 72 voices (1964)
 Die Ermittlung, for tape (1965)
 A floresta é jovem e cheja de vida, for soprano, three voices, clarinet, percussion and tape (1966)
 Ricorda cosa ti hanno fatto in Auschwitz, for tape (1966)
 Per Bastiana – Tai-Yang Cheng, for tape and three instrumental ensembles (1967)
 Contrappunto dialettico alla mente, for tape (1968)
 Intolleranza 1960 Suite, for soprano, tape and orchestra (1969)
 Musiche per Manzù, for tape (1969)
 Musica-Manifesto n. 1: Un volto, del mare – Non consumiamo Marx, for soprano, voice and tape (1969)
 San Vittore 1969 (1969)
 Voci destroying muros (1970)
 Y entonces comprendió (1970)
 Ein Gespenst geht um in der Welt, for soprano, chorus and orchestra (1971)
 Como una ola de fuerza y luz, for soprano, piano, orchestra and tape (1972)
 Siamo la gioventù del Vietnam, for one-part chorus (1973)
 Für Paul Dessau, for tape (1974)
 Al gran sole carico d’amore, azione scenica for soloists, small and large chorus, orchestra and tape (1975)
 I turcs tal Friúl (1976)
 ... sofferte onde serene ..., for piano and tape (1976)
 Al gran sole carico d’amore (Fragments), for soloists, chorus, orchestra and tape (1978)
 Con Luigi Dallapiccola, for percussion and live electronics (1979)
 Fragmente – Stille, An Diotima, for string quartet (1980)
 Das atmende Klarsein, for small chorus, bass flute, live electronics and tape (1981)
 Io, frammento dal Prometeo, for three sopranos, small chorus, bass flute, bass clarinet and live electronics (1981)
 ¿Donde estás hermano?, for four female voices (1982)
 Quando stanno morendo. Diario polacco No. 2, for four female voices, bass flute, cello and live electronics (1982)
 Guai ai gelidi mostri, for two altos, flute, clarinet, tuba, viola, cello, double bass and live electronics (1983)
 Omaggio a György Kurtág, for alto, flute, clarinet, bass tuba and live electronics (1983)
 Prometeo. Tragedia dell’ascolto, for vocal and instrumental soloists, mixed chorus, four instrumental ensembles and live electronics (1984)
 A Carlo Scarpa, architetto, ai suoi infiniti possibili, for orchestra in microintervals  (1984)
 A Pierre. Dell’azzurro silenzio, inquietum, for bass flute, bass clarinet and live electronics (1985)
 Risonanze erranti. Liederzyklus a Massimo Cacciari, for mezzo-soprano, flute, tuba, six percussionists and live electronics (1986)
 1° Caminantes…..Ayacucho, for alto, flute, small and large chorus, organ, orchestra and live electronics (1987)
 2° No hay caminos, hay que caminar.....Andrej Tarkowskij, for seven ensembles (1987)
 Post-prae-ludium No. 1 per Donau, for tuba and live electronics (1987)
 Découvrir la subversion. Hommage à Edmond Jabès, for alto, narrator, flute, tuba, French horn and live electronics (1987)
 Post-prae-ludium No. 3, “BAAB-ARR”, for piccolo and live electronics (1988)
 La lontananza nostalgica utopica futura. Madrigale per più “caminantes” con Gidon Kremer, for violin and eight tapes (1988)
 “Hay que caminar” soñando, for two violins (1989)

Nono, Luigi